This is a list of Members of Parliament (MPs) elected to the Grand National Assembly for the 24th Parliament of the Republic of Turkey at the 2011 general election.

Electoral districts are ordered according to plate codes of respective provinces, and parties within the electoral districts are ordered according to their nationwide vote (AKP, CHP, MHP, independents). Within the parties, MPs are ordered according to their orders in the party lists.

The list shows the parties from which they were elected, not subsequent changes. It also does not show the vacated seats. 15 seats have been vacated as of 8 February 2015 (4 deaths, 10 elected mayors, 1 elected president

Adana

Adıyaman

Afyonkarahisar

Ağrı

Amasya

Ankara

Region 1

Region 2

Antalya

Artvin

Aydın

Balıkesir

Bilecik

Bingöl

Bitlis

Bolu

Burdur

Bursa

Çanakkale

Çankırı

Çorum

Denizli

Diyarbakır

Edirne

Elazığ

Erzincan

Erzurum

Eskişehir

Gaziantep

Giresun

Gümüşhane

Hakkari

Hatay

Isparta

Mersin

Istanbul

Region 1

Region 2

Region 3

Izmir

Region 1

Region 2

Kahramanmaraş

Kars

Kastamonu

Kayseri

Kırklareli

Kırşehir

Kocaeli

Konya

Kütahya

Malatya

Manisa

Mardin

Muğla

Muş

Nevşehir

Niğde

Ordu

Rize

Sakarya

Samsun

Siirt

Sinop

Sivas

Şanlıurfa

Tekirdağ

Tokat

Trabzon

Tunceli

Uşak

Van

Yozgat

Zonguldak

Aksaray

Bayburt

Karaman

Kırıkkale

Batman

Şırnak

Bartın

Ardahan

Iğdır

Yalova

Karabük

Kilis

Osmaniye

Düzce

External links
Current state of the parties  - Turkish Parliament
 Full election data as a spreadsheet, Hürriyet

2011 Turkish general election

Terms of the Grand National Assembly of Turkey
Political history of Turkey